List of poems by John Keats.

 Ode to a Nightingale
 Ode on a Grecian Urn
 Ode to Psyche
 Ode To Autumn
 Ode on Melancholy
 Ode on Indolence
 Ode to Fanny
 Ode – (Bards of Passion and of Mirth)
 Lines on the Mermaid Tavern
 Robin Hood – To a Friend
 Ode to Apollo

Other poems by John Keats:
 I stood tiptoe upon a little hill
 Specimen of an induction to a poem
 Calidore – a fragment
 To Some Ladies
 On Receiving a Curious Shell, and a Copy of Verses from the Same Ladies
 To – Georgiana Augusta Wylie, afterwards Mrs. George Keats
 To Hope
 Imitation of Spenser
 Three Sonnets on Woman
 Sleep and Poetry
 On Death
 Women, Wine, and Snuff
 Fill For Me a Brimming Bowl
 Isabella or The Pot of Basil
 To a Young Lady who Sent Me a Laurel Crown
 On Receiving a Laurel Crown from Leigh Hunt
 To the Ladies who Saw me Crown'd
 Hymn to Apollo
 The Eve of St. Agnes
 The Naughty Boy

Epistles
 To George Felton Mathew
 To My Brother George
 To Charles Cowden Clarke
 To John Hamilton Reynolds

Sonnets
 To My Brother George
 To – [Had I a man's fair form, then might my sighs]
 Written on the Day that Mr. Leigh Hunt left Prison
 How many bards gild the lapses of time!
 To a Friend Who Sent Me Some Roses
 To G. A. W. [Georgiana Augusta Wylie]
 O Solitude! if I must with thee dwell
 To My Brothers
 Keen, fitful gusts are whisp'ring here and there
 To one who has been long in city pent
 On First Looking into Chapman's Homer
 On Leaving Some Friends at an Early Hour
 Addressed to Haydon
 On the Grasshopper and Cricket
 To Koscuisko
 Happy is England! I could be content
 Sonnet on Peace
 Sonnet to Byron
 Sonnet to Chatterton
 Sonnet to Spenser
 On the Sonnet
 On the Sea
 When I have Fears That I May Cease to Be

Endymion
(A Poetic Romance)

 Book I
 Book II
 Book III
 Book IV

Lamia
 Lamia – part 1
 Lamia – part 2

Hyperion – A Fragment
  Hyperion – Book I
  Hyperion – Book II
  Hyperion – Book III

See also
 Bibliography of John Keats

 
Keats, John